Leonie Callaghan (born 1959) is an Australian former cricket player.  Callaghan played for New South Wales women's cricket team between 1980 and 1985, and played one One Day International for the Australia national women's cricket team.

References

External links
 Leonie Callaghan at southernstars.org.au

Living people
1959 births
Australia women One Day International cricketers